Oscar Diesel (born 19 September 1961) is a Paraguayan athlete. He competed in the men's long jump and the men's triple jump at the 1984 Summer Olympics.

References

1961 births
Living people
Athletes (track and field) at the 1984 Summer Olympics
Paraguayan male long jumpers
Paraguayan male triple jumpers
Olympic athletes of Paraguay
Place of birth missing (living people)